Willimantic is a town in Piscataquis County, Maine, United States. The population was 134 according to the 2020 census.

Name
The town was originally named Howard; after the Willimantic Linen Company erected a woodworking factory in 1879 to produce spools for thread, it was renamed in 1881 to Willimantic, after Willimantic, Connecticut.

Geography

Demographics

2010 census
As of the census of 2010, there were 150 people, 69 households, and 43 families living in the town. The racial makeup of the town was 98.0% White, 1.3% Native American, and 0.7% from two or more races.

There were 69 households, of which 15.9% had children under the age of 18 living with them, 55.1% were married couples living together, 2.9% had a female householder with no husband present, 4.3% had a male householder with no wife present, and 37.7% were non-families. 29.0% of all households were made up of individuals, and 10.1% had someone living alone who was 65 years of age or older. The average household size was 2.17 and the average family size was 2.72.

The median age in the town was 52 years. 17.3% of residents were under the age of 18; 4.7% were between the ages of 18 and 24; 12.7% were from 25 to 44; 42.7% were from 45 to 64; and 22.7% were 65 years of age or older. The gender makeup of the town was 49.3% male and 50.7% female.

2000 census
As of the census of 2000, there were 135 people, 55 households, and 39 families living in the town. The population density was 3.1 people per square mile (1.2/km). There were 225 housing units at an average density of 5.2 per square mile (2.0/km). The racial makeup of the town was 91.11% White, 3.70% Native American, 1.48% from other races, and 3.70% from two or more races. Hispanic or Latino of any race were 1.48% of the population.

There were 55 households, out of which 27.3% had children under the age of 18 living with them, 60.0% were married couples living together, 7.3% had a female householder with no husband present, and 27.3% were non-families. 21.8% of all households were made up of individuals, and 10.9% had someone living alone who was 65 years of age or older. The average household size was 2.45 and the average family size was 2.90.

In the town, the population was spread out, with 25.2% under the age of 18, 3.7% from 18 to 24, 21.5% from 25 to 44, 32.6% from 45 to 64, and 17.0% who were 65 years of age or older. The median age was 45 years. For every 100 females, there were 117.7 males. For every 100 females age 18 and over, there were 110.4 males.

The median income for a household in the town was $26,250, and the median income for a family was $29,375. Males had a median income of $40,000 versus $33,125 for females. The per capita income for the town was $14,206. There were 20.0% of families and 26.6% of the population living below the poverty line, including 39.3% of under eighteens and 57.1% of those over 64.

References

Towns in Piscataquis County, Maine
Towns in Maine